Macromidia ishidai is a species of dragonfly in family Synthemistidae. It is endemic to Japan.

References

Insects of Japan
Synthemistidae
Taxonomy articles created by Polbot